Cypris is a name for Aphrodite, the Greek goddess of love.

Cypris may also refer to:

Mythology
Cypris, one of the Horae, Greek goddesses personifying the hours of the day
Cypris, a role in the opera Ariane by Jules Massenet

Biology
Cypris, a barnacle larva in its final, cyprid stage
Apanteles cypris, a species of braconid wasp in the genus Apanteles
Eudesmia cypris, a species of moth in the family Erebidae
Morpho cypris, a species of neotropical butterfly
Phoebis cypris, synonym for Phoebis argante, a species of butterfly in the family Pieridae
Tipula cypris, a species of crane fly in the genus Tipula

Other
CYPRIS (microchip), a cryptographic microprocessor
Villa Cypris, a villa in the French Riviera

See also
Cypres
Cypress (disambiguation)
Cyprus (disambiguation)